(2E,6E)-farnesyl-diphosphate:isopentenyl-diphosphate farnesyltranstransferase may refer to:
 Hexaprenyl-diphosphate synthase ((2E,6E)-farnesyl-diphosphate specific), an enzyme
 All-trans-octaprenyl-diphosphate synthase, an enzyme
 All-trans-decaprenyl-diphosphate synthase, an enzyme